William A Wirt Senior High School was a four-year (9-12) public high school of the Gary Community School Corporation in Gary, Indiana. In May 2009 the school announced that after over 70 years, it would finally be closing. As of 2011, the site is used for the Wirt Emerson VPA Academy, a magnet school for the visual and performing arts.

Staff
The faculty included nearly 50 teachers.

History
Wirt High School was established in 1939; it was named after Dr. William Albert Wirt, who served as the first superintendent of the Gary Schools from 1907 to early 1938. Former MLB player Ron Kittle is an alumnus of Wirt.  Multi-instrumentalist and vocalist Crystal Taliefero is also an alumna of Wirt.

Wirt High School was closed in 2009 due to Gary Community School Corporation budget cuts.

References

External links
William A. Wirt Senior High School Official Site
William A. Wirt Senior High School Official Alumni Site
Official Site for Alumni of the Class of 1970

Wirt
Wirt
Educational institutions established in 1939
Educational institutions disestablished in 2009
1939 establishments in Indiana